The 2018 season is PKNS's 5th season in the top flight of Malaysian football, the Malaysia Super League after being promoted from 2016 Malaysia Premier League.

Club officials

Transfers

First transfer

In:

Out:

Mid season transfer

In:

Out:

Pre-season and friendlies

Malaysia Super League

Malaysia FA Cup

Malaysia Cup

Group stage

Knock-stage

Statistics

Squad appearances

Statistics accurate as of 30 September 2018.

Clean sheets

References

External links
 

 
Malaysian football clubs 2018 season